David Gewanter is an American poet.

Life
He teaches at Georgetown University, and lives in Washington, D. C., with his wife, writer Joy Young, and son James.

His work has appeared in Ploughshares.

Awards
 1980: Hopwood Award, University of Michigan
 1989: Eisner Prize, University of California, Berkeley
 1990: Academy of American Poets Prize, University of California, Berkeley
 1994: Levinson Award, Harvard University
 1998: John C. Zacharis First Book Award for In the Belly
 1999: Witter Bynner Fellowship, Library of Congress 
 2002: Whiting Award
 2003: James Laughlin Award - finalist for The Sleep of Reason
 2004: Ambassador Book Award for Robert Lowell: Collected Poems
 2004: "Book of the Year" for Robert Lowell: Collected Poems

Works
 "GAG"; "ENGLISH 1"; "SEE SAW"; "CONVULVOLUS, A LULLABY"; "CONDUCT OF OUR LOVES", Beltway Poetry Quarterly
 "Against the Grain", Slate
 "Traffic of Creations", Slate, July 23, 2002

Editor

Anthology

Ploughshares

Essay
 "Essay: The Problem of Originality", Smartish Pace

References

External links

 "Interview with David Gewanter", Library of Congress
Profile at The Whiting Foundation

Year of birth missing (living people)
Living people
American male poets
Georgetown University faculty